Róbert Rudolf (born 20 June 1957) is a retired Hungarian  swimmer who won a bronze medal at the 1974 European Aquatics Championships. He competed in the 100 m and 200 m backstroke events at the Summer Olympics of 1972, 1976 and 1980; his best achievement was seventh place in 200 m in 1976.

References

1957 births
Living people
Swimmers at the 1972 Summer Olympics
Swimmers at the 1976 Summer Olympics
Swimmers at the 1980 Summer Olympics
Olympic swimmers of Hungary
Hungarian male swimmers
European Aquatics Championships medalists in swimming
Male backstroke swimmers
Swimmers from Budapest
20th-century Hungarian people
21st-century Hungarian people